G.S. Lamia is a Greek volleyball club based in Lamia. It was founded in 1976 and it plays in A1 Ethniki championship. The gymnasium of the club is the Lamia indoor hall and their colours are the cyan and white. Its emblem is owed to legendary hero of Phthiotis, Achilleus (Achilles).

History
GS Lamia was founded in 1976. It was promoted to A1 Ethniki in 2005 and since then plays continuously in the highest level championship. The greatest success of Lamia was its presence in the final of Greek Cup twice, in 2007 and in 2012. The last season, Lamia was threatened with relegation but it was rescued in the play-out games.

Recent seasons

Honours
Greek Volleyball Cup
Finalist (2): 2007, 2012

References

External links
Official page

Greek volleyball clubs